During the dot-com/internet bubble of the late 1990s and early 2000, the proliferation of many dot-com start-up companies created a secondary bubble in the telecommunications/computer networking infrastructure and telecommunications service provider markets. Venture capital and high tech companies rushed to build next generation infrastructure equipment for the expected explosion of internet traffic. As part of that investment fever, network processors were seen as a method of dealing with the desire for more network services and the ever-increasing data-rates of communication networks.

It has been estimated that dozens of start-up companies were created in the race to build the processors that would be a component of the next generation telecommunications equipment. Once the internet investment bubble burst, the telecom network upgrade cycle was deferred for years (perhaps for a decade). As a result, the majority of these new companies went bankrupt.

As of 2007, the only companies that are shipping network processors in sizeable volumes are Cisco Systems, Marvell, Freescale, Cavium Networks and AMCC.

OC-768/40Gb routing
 ClearSpeed  left network processor market, reverted to supercomputing applications
 Propulsion Networks  defunct
 BOPS  left network processor market, reverted to DSP applications

OC-192/10Gb routing
 Terago  defunct
 Clearwater Networks  originally named Xstream Logic, defunct
 Silicon Access  defunct
 Solidum Systems  acquired by Integrated Device Technology
 Lexra  defunct
 Fast-Chip  defunct
 Cognigine Corp.  defunct
 Internet Machines  morphed into IMC Semiconductors, a PCI-Express chip vendor
 Acorn Networks  defunct
 XaQti  acquired by Vitesse Semiconductor, product line discontinued

OC-48/2.5Gb routing
 IP Semiconductors  defunct
 Entridia  defunct
 Stargate Solutions  defunct

Gigabit Ethernet routing
 Sibyte  acquired by Broadcom, product line discontinued
 PMC-Sierra  product line discontinued

OC-12 routing
 C-port  acquired by Motorola (now Freescale), product line discontinued
 IBM  PowerNP product line discontinued
 Sitera  acquired by Vitesse, product line discontinued

Access products
 Netargy  defunct
 Ishoni Networks  defunct
 HyWire   defunct

VOIP products
 Silicon Spice  acquired by Broadcom, product line discontinued
 Malleable Technologies  acquired by PMC-Sierra, product line discontinued

Traffic managers
 Extreme Packet Devices  acquired by PMC-Sierra, product line discontinued
 Azanda Network Devices  acquired by Cortina, product line being sold as CS53xx family
 Teradiant  defunct
 Orologic  acquired by Vitesse, product line discontinued
 Maker Communications  acquired by Conexant, product line discontinued

Packet classifiers
 SwitchOn  acquired by PMC-Sierra, product line discontinued
 FastChip  defunct

Switch fabrics
 Abrizio  acquired by PMC-Sierra, product line discontinued
 Stargen  left networking market for computer server market

Security products
 Chrysalis-ITS  defunct

 
Defunct network processor companies
Network processor companies